Garbis Aprikian (born 1926) is a musician from the Armenian Diaspora. He has composed many vocal and instrumental works in which Western musical technique (counterpoint, fugue...) marries Armenian melodies. As a performer, Garbis Aprikian has directed for about fifty years the Armenian mixed chorus of Paris Sipan-Komitas. His contribution in the European knowledge of the works of Komitas, Ganatchian and Alemshah is crucial .

Biography 
Born in Alexandria, Egypt, in 1926, Garbis Aprikian took part in the cultural and artistic life of this cosmopolitan city when he was very young . He studied at primary school "Armenian National Boghossian," then the American College. From the age of ten he began a serious musical learning with a student of Pietro Mascagni, the maestro Frapicini who took care of his artistic education: piano, then harmony, counterpoint and fugue.

In 1948, Garbis Aprikian founded the mixed chorus Hamazkaine with which he gave, in Alexandria and in Cairo, a series of concerts. The success encouraged members of the association Houssaper to assign him a scholarship to complete his training in Europe. Garbis Aprikian arrived in Paris where he studied composition and conducting of orchestra at the Ecole Normale of Music with Simone Plé-Caussade, Tony Aubin and Jean Fournet and took a course of musical aesthetics by Olivier Messiaen at the Conservatoire national. The Armenian mixed chorus then sought him to replace Kourkène Alemshah, conductor and composer of talent gone to middle age. 

Since then, his life and work are inseparable from activities of the choir he directs . For the chorus, Garbis Aprikian composes and harmonizes popular melodies and old patriotic songs, more than two hundred religious, profane or folk works.

For the first time in 1991, he was invited by the Armenian authorities to go to Yerevan, where he performed in a concert his own works and those of the composers of the Armenian Diaspora.

The works of Garbis Aprikian 
List of works of Garbis Aprikian

Creations 

 Kovk—praises and wishes—for chorus
 Hymn—blessings—for chorus
 Scherzo—rejoicing—for chorus
 Little Nuptial Suite—in 4 movements for mezzo, harp and cello
 Oror—Lullaby for mezzo, harp and cello (and a chorus version)
  Sweet is the night—melody with piano
 Ledjag—melody with piano
 Lamento—complaint of an orphan
 Nocturne—Fugue
 Es Kechir—dance for solo, chorus and orchestra
 Ninam—Niman—dance for solo, chorus and orchestra
 Dark Sky—for chorus and orchestra
 Nocturne—on a theme by Komitas for solo, chorus and orchestra
 Tchellar—Tchellar—Divertimento for soli, chorus and orchestra
 Orchestral Prelude—on a poem of Gh. Aghayan for orchestra
 The birth of David of Sassoon—profane oratorio

Works of Ganatchian entirely revised enhanced and orchestrated 

 Nanor—Description of a pilgrimage – for soli, chorus and orchestra
 Aphegha'n—Holy Legend—Lyric drama in one act—Harmonization—Orchestration and arrangements

From popular sources 

  Hay Yeghpaïne—for chorus and orchestra
 Togh Gorentchin—for chorus and orchestra
 Iprev Ardziv—for chorus and orchestra
 Lamentation of Vaspourakan—for chorus and orchestra
 Karahissar—for solo, chorus and orchestra

From Komitas 

 "Braves of Sipan—for chorus and orchestra
 Gali Yerk—for soli, chorus and orchestra

 From Patmagrian 
 Haralé—for soli, chorus and orchestra
 Yar Gula—for chorus and orchestra
 Yalali—for chorus and orchestra
 Six Armenian songs for piano to young pianists

 From Ganatchian 

 The willow—melody with orchestra
 The dream of Alvarte—melody with orchestra
 Choucho—for chorus with orchestra
 With the Roses'—for chorus and orchestra

Honours 
 1989 Medal of Saint Nerces Chenorali by Vasken I, Catholicos of all Armenians
 1993 Medal of Saint Mesrop Machtots by Garéguine II Nersissian of the Great House Of Cilicie
 1994 Medal of Sahak-Mesrop by Vasken I
 1994"Vermeil"  Medal of the City of Paris awarded by Jacques Chirac
 2004 Knight of Arts and Letters
 2007 Medal of the City of Marseille

References
Nouvelles Armenie Magazine forum commentary on Six chants arméniens by Aprikian, accessed 8 February 2010 
Gulbenkian Foundation grant notice,  accessed 8 February 2010 
Asbarez Post notice of honour given to Aprikian, accessed 8 February 2010

External links
 Garbis Kaprikian Chorale Sipan-Komitas (Choeur Mixte Arménien de Paris) (French), accessed 8 February 2010

1926 births
Ethnic Armenian composers
Egyptian people of Armenian descent
Living people
People from Alexandria
Egyptian emigrants to France
École Normale de Musique de Paris alumni
Conservatoire de Paris alumni